Takush Harbour is a harbour on the south side of Smith Sound in the Central Coast region of British Columbia, Canada.  Nathlegalis IR No. 3 of the Gwa'sala-'Nakwaxda'xw Nations band government of the Kwakwaka'wakw peoples is located in Browning Channel in front of the harbour.  The Takush River enters Smith Sound in the same area, at Ahclakerho Channel.

References

Ports and harbours of British Columbia
Central Coast of British Columbia
Kwakwaka'wakw